In rugby union, the "99" call was a policy of simultaneous retaliation by the British Lions during their 1974 tour to South Africa. The tour was marred by on-pitch violence, which the match officials did little to control and the relative absence of cameras compared to the modern game made citing and punishment after the fact unlikely.

Lions' captain Willie John McBride therefore instigated a policy of "one in, all in" - that is, when one Lion retaliated, all other Lions were expected to join in the melee or hit the nearest Springbok. By doing so, the referee would be unable to identify any single instigator and so would be left with the choice of sending off all or none of the team. In this respect, the "99" call was extremely successful, as no Lions player was sent off during the tour.

According to former Wales international and Lion John Taylor, the 99 call resulted from an incident that occurred during the Lions' 1968 South Africa tour that saw John O'Shea become the first and to date only Lion to have been sent off during a Lions tour. In 2013, Taylor recalled that during a Lions tour match against Eastern Transvaal,A scuffle broke out amongst the forwards (handbags – no damage) and Tess (O'Shea) was isolated by half a dozen home forwards. When the dust settled the home referee singled him out (the only Lion involved) and dismissed him. . . . Willie John rushed down from the stand to offer protection, dealing peremptorily with one idiot as he tried to attack Tess, and this was the genesis of the infamous '99' call six years later in 1974. 

At the battle of Boet Erasmus Stadium, one of the most violent matches in rugby history, there is famous video footage of J.P.R. Williams running over half of the pitch and launching himself at Moaner van Heerden after such a call, something that Williams says he is not proud of.

References

External links
A video of the 99 call in action
. Background piece on the importance of rugby to Afrikaans speaking South Africans.

British & Irish Lions
1973–74 in British rugby union
1974 in South African rugby union
Brawls in team sports
Rugby union controversies